McClure is an unincorporated community in Dickenson County, Virginia, United States. McClure had a post office from 1919 until it closed on July 6, 2011; it still has its own ZIP code, 24269.

Legend has it McClure was named for a pioneer settler who was killed by Indians.

References

Unincorporated communities in Dickenson County, Virginia
Unincorporated communities in Virginia